Gregory Baker Wolfe (January 27, 1922 – December 12, 2015)  was a United States diplomat during the Kennedy and Johnson administrations, and later President of two urban institutions of higher education, Portland State University in Portland, Oregon, and Florida International University (FIU) in Miami, Florida.

Early life, education, and military service
Born in Los Angeles, California, to Russian immigrant parents, Wolfe received an undergraduate degree from Reed College in Portland, and a doctorate from the Fletcher School of Law and Diplomacy in Massachusetts. Wolfe served in World War II, and was thereafter an intelligence analyst for the U.S. State Department.

Academic career
In 1968, Wolfe was named president of Portland State University, which position he held until 1974, when he ran for Congress in the Democrat primary in Portland. He finished third out of seven candidates, and then moved to teach at American University.

Wolfe was appointed president of Florida International University in 1979, over the objection of some state legislators who preferred a local candidate for the position. He served until his resignation in 1986, during which time he oversaw significant growth as the university progressed from being an exclusively upper-division school (having no freshman or sophomores) to becoming a four-year college granting post-graduate degrees. He also oversaw the addition of the university's engineering, nursing, and journalism programs. The Florida State Legislature recognized Wolfe's contributions to the growth and emergence of FIU by naming the Gregory Baker Wolfe University Center, located on FIU's Biscayne Bay Campus, in his honor.

Personal life
Wolfe and his wife Mary Ann had three children. Wolfe died in Coral Gables, Florida.

References

1922 births
2015 deaths
American diplomats
Presidents of Florida International University
Presidents of Portland State University
People from Los Angeles
The Fletcher School at Tufts University alumni
Reed College alumni
American military personnel of World War II